Francis Bawaana Dakura is a Ghanaian politician and member of the Seventh Parliament of the Fourth Republic of Ghana representing the Jirapa Constituency in the Upper West Region on the ticket of the National Democratic Congress.

References

Ghanaian MPs 2017–2021
1961 births
Living people
National Democratic Congress (Ghana) politicians